Marie Windsor (born Emily Marie Bertelsen; December 11, 1919 – December 10, 2000) was an American actress known for her femme fatale characters in the classic film noir features Force of Evil, The Narrow Margin and The Killing. Windsor's height (5'9") created problems for her in scenes with all but the tallest actors. She was the female lead in so many B movies that she became dubbed the "Queen" of the genre.

Early years
The daughter of Mr. and Mrs. Lane Bertelsen, Windsor was born in 1919 in Marysvale, Utah. She was graduated from Marysvale High School in 1934, doing a "musical reading" as part of the graduation exercises. She attended Brigham Young University, where she participated in dramatic productions. She was described in a 1939 newspaper article as "an accomplished athlete ... expert as a dancer, swimmer, horsewoman, and plays golf, tennis and skis."

In 1939, Windsor was chosen from a group of 81 contestants to be queen of Covered Wagon Days in Salt Lake City, Utah. She was unofficially appointed "Miss Utah of 1939" by her hometown Chamber of Commerce, and trained for the stage under famed Hollywood actress and coach Maria Ouspenskaya. Voluptuous and leggy, but unusually tall for a starlet of her generation, Windsor felt that she was handicapped when playing opposite actors of average stature (claiming that she had to progressively bend at the knees walking across the room in scene with John Garfield). As she later recalled, a production with Forrest Tucker as co-star made her happy with finally getting male lead who was her 'own size'.

In later years, thanks to her early screen success, Windsor was able to pursue her studies more extensively, primarily with Stella Adler and also at the Lee Strasberg Theatre Institute.

Windsor worked in radio in Salt Lake City before moving to California. In California, she worked as a model for glamor photographer Paul Hesse.

Stage
In 1940, after her move to Hollywood and entering Ouspenskaya's drama school, she appeared in the play Forty Thousand Smiths, her first use of the stage name "Marie Windsor". The next year she appeared in Once in a Lifetime at the Pasadena Playhouse. She also played a villain in a New York production of Follow the Girls. Years later, in the 1980s, she returned to the stage.

Film
After working for several years as a telephone operator, a stage and radio actress, and a bit part and extra player in films, Windsor began playing feature parts on the big screen in 1947.

Her first film contract, with Warner Bros. in 1942, resulted from her writing jokes and submitting them to Jack Benny. Windsor said she submitted the gags under the name M.E. Windsor "because I was afraid he might be prejudiced against a woman gag writer". When Benny finally met Windsor, "he was stunned by her good looks" and had a producer sign her to a contract. After a tenure with Metro-Goldwyn-Mayer in which the studio "signed her, put her in two small roles and then promptly forgot her", she signed a seven-year contract in 1948 with The Enterprise Studios.

The actress' first memorable role in 1948 was with John Garfield in Force of Evil playing seductress Edna Tucker. She had roles in numerous 1950s film noirs, notably The Sniper, The Narrow Margin, City That Never Sleeps, and the Stanley Kubrick heist film, The Killing, in which she played Elisha Cook, Jr.'s, scheming wife. She also made her first foray into science fiction with the release of Cat-Women of the Moon (1953). Windsor co-starred with Randolph Scott in The Bounty Hunter (1954).

Television
Later, Windsor moved to television. She appeared as "The Mutton Puncher" in season 3 of Cheyenne, in 1957.  She appeared in 1954 as Belle Starr in the premiere episode of Stories of the Century. In 1962, she played Ann Jesse, a woman dying in childbirth, in the episode "The Wanted Man" of Lawman. Windsor appeared in the first season of Barnaby Jones; episode "Twenty Million Alibis" (May 5, 1973).

Windsor worked consistently through the 1960s, 1970s and 1980s. She appeared on programs such as Cheyenne, Bat Masterson, Tales of Wells Fargo, Yancy Derringer, 77 Sunset Strip, Maverick (in the 1957 episode titled "The Quick and the Dead" with James Garner and Gerald Mohr as Doc Holliday), The Red Skelton Hour, Hawaiian Eye, Perry Mason, Bourbon Street Beat, The F.B.I., The Incredible Hulk, Rawhide, Adam-12, Mannix, Charlie's Angels, General Hospital, Salem's Lot, and Murder, She Wrote. Windsor remained on screen once or so annually up to the 1990s, playing her final role and going into retirement in 1991 at the age of 72.

Recognition
Windsor has a star in at 1549 N. Vine Street in the Motion Pictures section of the Hollywood Walk of Fame. It was dedicated January 19, 1983.

In 1987, Windsor received the Los Angeles Drama Critics Circle Award for best actress for her work in The Bar Off Melrose. She also received the Ralph Morgan Award from the Screen Actors Guild for her service on the organization's board of directors.

Personal life
Windsor was married briefly to bandleader Ted Steele. They were wed April 21, 1946, in Marysvale, Utah. They divorced that same year (an item in a 1953 newspaper column says that the marriage was ended by annulment, not divorce).

In July 1950, newspaper columnist Louella Parsons reported, "Marie Windsor has set her marriage to Alex Lunciman, a Beverly Hills stock broker, for October".

She married realtor Jack Hupp, a member of the 1936 U.S. Olympic basketball team. Hupp had his own family connection with show business; he was the son of actor Earle Rodney. Hupp, with whom Windsor had a son, Richard Rodney, was inducted posthumously into the University of Southern California (USC) Athletic Hall of Fame in 2007. Hupp had a son, Chris, from a prior marriage.

Windsor was politically conservative, a member of the Screen Actors Guild, and supportive of the Motion Picture and Television Fund. A Republican, she supported Dwight Eisenhower's campaign in the 1952 presidential election.

After her acting career ended, Windsor became a painter and sculptor. Windsor was also a lifelong Mormon.

Death
Windsor died of congestive heart failure on December 10, 2000, the day before her 81st birthday. She is interred with Hupp in her native Marysvale, Utah, at Mountain View Cemetery.

Filmography

 Unexpected Uncle (1941) as Passerby on Sidewalk (uncredited)
 Weekend for Three (1941) as Extra (uncredited)
 All-American Co-Ed (1941) as Carrot Queen (uncredited)
 Playmates (1941) as Nightclub Patron (uncredited)
 Joan of Paris (1942) as French Girl in Cafe (uncredited)
 Four Jacks and a Jill (1942) as Girl Applying Makeup (uncredited)
 Call Out the Marines (1942) as Pretty Brunette on Tour (uncredited)
 The Lady or the Tiger? (1942) as The Princess (uncredited)
 Flying with Music (1942) as Native Girl (uncredited)
 Parachute Nurse (1942) as Company 'C' Girl (uncredited)
 Smart Alecks (1942) as Nurse
 The Big Street (1942) as Florida Nightclub Patron (uncredited)
 Eyes in the Night (1942) as Actress at Rehearsal (uncredited)
 George Washington Slept Here (1942) as Woman at Train Station (uncredited)
 Chatterbox (1943) as Hostess (uncredited)
 Three Hearts for Julia (1943) as Violinist (uncredited)
 Pilot No. 5 (1943) as Mrs. Claven (uncredited)
 Let's Face It (1943) as Chorus Girl (uncredited)
 The Iron Major (1943) as Young Woman at Dock (uncredited)
 Follow the Leader (1944) as Native Girl in Dream (uncredited)
 I Love My Wife, But! (1947) as Saleswoman (uncredited)
 Living in a Big Way (1947) as Jane, Junior League Girl (uncredited)
 The Hucksters (1947) as Girl on Train (uncredited)
 The Romance of Rosy Ridge (1947) as Baggett Daughter (uncredited)
 Song of the Thin Man (1947) as Helen Amboy
 The Unfinished Dance (1947) as Saleslady (uncredited)
 On an Island with You (1948) as Jane (uncredited)
 The Pirate (1948) as Madame Lucia (uncredited)
 The Three Musketeers (1948) as Lady-in-Waiting (uncredited)
 Force of Evil (1948) as Edna Tucker
 Outpost in Morocco (1949) as Cara
 The Beautiful Blonde from Bashful Bend (1949) as LaBelle Bergere (uncredited)
 Hellfire (1949) as Mary Carson / Doll Brown
 The Fighting Kentuckian (1949) as Ann Logan
 Dakota Lil (1950) as Dakota Lil
 The Showdown (1950) as Adelaide
 Double Deal (1950) as Terry Miller
 Frenchie (1950) as Diane Gorman
 Little Big Horn (1951) as Celie Donlin
 Hurricane Island (1951) as Jan Bolton
 Two Dollar Bettor (1951) as Mary Slate
 Japanese War Bride (1952) as Fran Sterling
 The Sniper (1952) as Jean Darr
 The Narrow Margin (1952) as Mrs. Frankie Neall
 Outlaw Women (1952) as Iron Mae McLeod
 The Jungle (1952) as Princess Mari
 The Tall Texan (1953) as Laura Thompson
 Trouble Along the Way (1953) as Anne Williams McCormick
 City That Never Sleeps (1953) as Lydia Biddel
 So This Is Love (1953) as Marilyn Montgomery
 Cat-Women of the Moon (1953) as Helen Salinger
 The Eddie Cantor Story (1953) as Cleo Abbott
 Hell's Half Acre (1954) as Rose
 The Bounty Hunter (1954) as Alice Williams
 The Silver Star (1955) as Karen Childress
 Abbott and Costello Meet the Mummy (1955) as Madame Rontru
 No Man's Woman (1955) as Carolyn Ellenson Grant
 Two-Gun Lady (1955) as Bess
 Swamp Women (1956) as Josie Nardo
 The Killing (1956) as Sherry Peatty
 The Unholy Wife (1957) as Gwen
 The Parson and the Outlaw (1957) as Tonya
 The Girl in Black Stockings (1957) as Julia Parry
 The Story of Mankind (1957) as Josephine Bonaparte
 Day of the Badman (1958) as Cora Johnson
 Island Women (1958) as Elizabeth
 Paradise Alley (1962) as Linda Belita
 This Is Not a Test (1962) as Mrs. Karen Barnes (under pseudonym Carol Kent)  
 The Day Mars Invaded Earth (1963) as Claire Fielding
 Critic's Choice (1963) as Sally Orr
 Mail Order Bride (1964) as Hanna
 Bedtime Story (1964) as Mrs. Sutton
 Chamber of Horrors (1966) as Madame Corona
 The Good Guys and the Bad Guys (1969) as Polly
 One More Train to Rob (1971) as Louella
 Support Your Local Gunfighter (1971) as Goldie
 Cahill U.S. Marshal (1973) as Mrs. Green
 The Outfit (1973) as Madge Coyle
 Hearts of the West (1975) as Woman in Nevada
 Freaky Friday (1976) as Mrs. Murphy
 Salem's Lot (1979) as Eva Miller
 Lovely But Deadly (1981) as Aunt May 
 Commando Squad (1987) as Casey

Source:

Television

 The Pepsi-Cola Playhouse in the episode "Live a Little" (1954)
 The Public Defender as Melody Scanlon in "The Ring" (1954)
 Stories of the Century as Belle Starr in the series premiere episode (1954)
 Waterfront as Marie Turner in the episode "Night at the Lighthouse" (1954)
 Science Fiction Theater as Nell Brown in the episode "Time is Just a Place" (1955)
 Cheyenne as Leda Brandt in "Decision at Gunsight" and as Thora Flagg in "The Mutton Puncher" (both 1957)
 The Californians as Dolly Dawson in "The Regulators" (1957)
 Maverick in the episodes "The Quick and the Dead" (1957) with James Garner and "Epitaph for a Gambler" (1962) with Jack Kelly
 Bat Masterson as saloon owner Polly Landers in "The Fighter" (1958)
 Perry Mason in four episodes:
 as Linda Griffith in "The Case of the Daring Decoy" (1958)
 as Flavia Pierce in "The Case of the Madcap Modiste" (1960)
 as Edith "Edie" Morrow in "The Case of the Tarnished Trademark" (1962)
 as Mrs. Helen Reed in "The Case of the Wednesday Woman" (1964)
 Yancy Derringer in episode 03, "Ticket to Natchez" (1958)
 Rawhide in three episodes:
 "Incident on the Edge of Madness" (1959)
 "Incident of the Painted Lady" (1961)
 "Incident of the Rusty Shotgun" (1964) as Amie Claybank
 The Alaskans as Maria Julien in the episode "Winter Song" (1959)
 Tales of Wells Fargo as Dolly Staples in the episode "The Warrior's Return" (1959)
 Bourbon Street Beat as Veda Troup in "The 10% Blues" and Mara in "Teresa" (both 1960)
 The Rebel as Emma Longdon in "Glory" (1960)
 Lassie as Mimi in "Little Cabbage" (1960)
 77 Sunset Strip as Countess Maruska in "Collector's Item" (1960)
 Hawaiian Eye in four episodes:
 "The Comics" (1961)
 "The Final Score" (1961)
 "Location Shooting" (1962)
 "Day in the Sun" (1962)
 Bonanza as Elizabeth Lassiter in the episode "Five Sundowns to Sunup" (1965)
 Batman in the episodes "Green Ice" and "Deep Freeze" (1966)
 Mannix in the episodes "The Need of a Friend" (1968) and "Walk a Double Line" (1974)
 Wild Women (1970) (TV)
 Adam-12, in the episodes "Log 56: Vice Versa" (1971), "The Chaser" (1972) and "Hollywood Division" (1973)
 Gunsmoke in the episode "Trafton" (1971)
 Alias Smith and Jones as Helen Archer in the episode "High Lonesome Country" (1971) (TV)
 Manhunter (1974)
 Police Story in the episode "Explosion" (1974)
 Marcus Welby, M.D. in the episode "The Highest Mountain" (1976)
 Charlie's Angels in the episodes "Angels in Springtime" (1978) and "Angels at the Altar" (1979)
 Salem's Lot (1979)
 Lou Grant (two episodes, 1979 and 1980)
 The Incredible Hulk as Belle Star in the episode "Sideshow" (1980)
 The Perfect Woman (1981)
 Simon & Simon in three episodes:
 "Murder Between the Lines" (1983)
 "The Dark Side of the Street" (1984)
 "For Old Crime's Sake" (1987)
 J.O.E. and the Colonel (1985)
 Tales from the Darkside as Madam Angler in the episode "A New Lease on Life" (1986)
 Commando Squad (1987)
 Supercarrier (1988)
 The New Adam-12 (1990)
 Murder, She Wrote (two episodes, 1987 and 1991)

References

Citations

Further reading
 Oderman, Stuart, Talking to the Piano Player 2. BearManor Media, 2009. .

External links

 Marie Windsor Biography
 
 
 
 Marie Windsor interview with The Perfect Vision magazine at Modern Times Classic Film Pages
 
 Literature on Marie Windsor
 Marie Windsor Papers. MSS 2301; 20th Century Western & Mormon Manuscripts; L. Tom Perry Special Collections, Harold B. Lee Library, Brigham Young University.

1919 births
2000 deaths
20th-century American actresses
Actresses from Utah
American Latter Day Saints
American film actresses
American radio actresses
American stage actresses
American television actresses
Lee Strasberg Theatre and Film Institute alumni
People from Piute County, Utah
Stella Adler Studio of Acting alumni
Brigham Young University alumni
California Republicans
Utah Republicans